Drew Smith can refer to:-

Drew Smith (politician), Scottish politician
Drew Smith (baseball), baseball player
Drew Nellins Smith, American writer

See also
Andrew Smith (disambiguation)